"It's the Little Things We Do" was the fourth single released from The Zutons second album Tired of Hanging Around. It became the band's first single since 2003 to fail to chart in the UK Top 40, peaking in the UK Top 75 at #47.

Track listing

CD Version
 "It's the Little Things We Do"
 "Sometimes I'm So Polite"
 "Valerie" (Live)
 "It's the Little Things We Do" (Video)

7" Version
 "It's the Little Things We Do"
 "Higher and Higher" (Colin Murray Session)

References

The Zutons songs
2006 singles
2006 songs
Songs written by Dave McCabe